Dragon Ball: Origins 2, known as  in Japan, is a video game for the Nintendo DS based on the  Dragon Ball franchise and the sequel to 2008's Dragon Ball: Origins. The game was developed by Game Republic and published by Namco Bandai throughout North America and everywhere else under the Bandai label. Released in 2010.

The game allows players, through stylus and touchscreen interactivity, to take on the role of series protagonist Son Goku who must journey with his friend to find the seven mythical Dragon Balls and stop the evil organization the Red Ribbon Army from achieving their goal of world domination. The original Japanese release comes with an emulated version of the 1986 Famicom video game Shenlong no Nazo included as a bonus feature.

Development 
The game was first announced in the December issue of V Jump magazine. The announcement revealed the game would retain most of the mechanics from Origins, it would mostly follow the Red Ribbon Army story arc, and a Japanese release date for February 11 of the following year. Later that month, it was announced that the game would include the emulated rom of the original Famicom game . This raised the question that if and when the game was released in English speaking markets, would the rom be included with an English translated script or be left out entirely, as that game had been originally released throughout North America under the title Dragon Power in 1986, and all evidence of the Dragon Ball license was removed. On February 18 the North American branch announced they would be distributing the game with the Origins moniker as used by Atari and would release the game sometime in the following summer. It was also revealed that the game would give the players the ability to play as not only Son Goku, but also Bulma, Kuririn, and Yamcha. Each character would have their own abilities and powerups. There would also include a two-player co-op mode. In early May it was announced that Origins 2 would be one of six games featured at E3 2010 for a hands on demonstration. On May 24, Namco Bandai North American branch released a statement announcing that the game was completed and would be released throughout North America on May 31. It was also stated that a playable demo would be available on the same day.

Reception 

The game was met with average to mixed reception upon release, as GameRankings gave it a score of 68.50%, while Metacritic gave it 70 out of 100.

Notes

References

External links
Official site

2010 video games
Video games developed in Japan
Bandai Namco games
Origins 2
Game Republic games
Nintendo DS games
Nintendo DS-only games
Action-adventure games